CKWS-DT (channel 11) is a television station in Kingston, Ontario, Canada, part of the Global Television Network. Owned and operated by network parent Corus Entertainment, the station maintains studios on Queen Street in downtown Kingston, and its transmitter is located near Highway 95 on Wolfe Island, south of the city.

History

CKWS signed-on December 18, 1954, as an affiliate of the CBC network. It was originally a joint venture between Roy Thomson and the Davies family, owners of The Kingston Whig-Standard (the source of its calls). The station has been sold three times: to the Kanatec Corporation, bought by Power Corporation in 1977 and to Corus in 1999.

Children across the country were exposed to CKWS programming in the late 1970s and 1980s by the Harrigan series – a particularly innocent and low budget show about a leprechaun, starring Barry Dale. Shelagh Rogers of CBC Radio fame started out presenting the weather for the station's newscasts.

During its days as a private CBC affiliate, it aired the minimum amount of CBC programming (40 hours per week).

On May 20, 2015, Corus and Bell Media announced an agreement whereby Corus' CBC affiliates, including CKWS, would leave the public network and instead "affiliate" with CTV. The switch took effect on August 31, 2015. Most TV service providers serving the region also carry CBC owned-and-operated station CBOT Ottawa, and any that do not will have to add a CBC affiliate such as CBOT to their basic services to comply with CRTC regulations. Legally, the affiliation was described as a "program supply agreement", and not as an "affiliation" (a term with specific legal implications under CRTC rules), as Corus maintained editorial control over the stations' programming and the ability to sell local advertising, and did not delegate responsibility for CTV programs aired by the station to Bell Media. Affiliations also require the consent of the CRTC.

The switch was approved by the Canadian Radio-television Telecommunications Commission on August 27, 2015, when it dismissed objections by Rogers Media (who argued that the change was an "affiliation" and thus required CRTC consent to implement, and was not in the public interest because it created duplicate sources of CTV programming), and by a resident who complained that as he only received television over the air, he would lose his ability to receive CBC Television as a result of the disaffiliation.

On August 14, 2018, it was announced that CKWS' affiliation agreement with CTV would expire on August 27; the station subsequently became a Global owned-and-operated station, rebranding itself as Global Kingston.

News programming 
CKWS produces 28 hours per week of local news programming, with 5½ hours each weekday, and a half–hour on Saturday. The station does not air any news programs on Sunday.

In September 2016, CKWS began to align its news programming with Global News rather than CTV News; it added airings of Global National in September 2016, and introduced a local morning show, The Morning Show (which is patterned after the program of the same name aired by sister and Global flagship station CIII-DT in Toronto, and the Global News Morning format used in other markets), on October 17, 2016, replacing CTV's national morning show Your Morning. At the same time, the station's noon newscast was shortened to half an hour, the CTV National News was dropped, and the station rebranded its newscasts from Newswatch to CKWS News.

Notable current on-air staff
 Bill Welychka – anchor; also producer

Technical information

Subchannels

Analogue-to-digital conversion
In January 2013, CKWS applied to the CRTC to convert its main Kingston transmitter to digital. The station had not announced plans to convert its transmitters in Prescott and Smiths Falls to digital, but did convert its Brighton translator CKWS-TV-1 to digital channel 30 on August 31, 2011 as its former analogue UHF channel 66 is now out-of-band. The Brighton digital signal was not initially broadcast in HD as it went on-air before CKWS converted its cable TV feed (and, later, its main signal) to high-definition digital TV.

The main CKWS transmitter at Wolfe Island/Kingston flash cut to digital on July 5, 2013 on its existing frequency, VHF channel 11. The station was not obligated to convert this transmitter, as Kingston was not one of the 31 markets in which the Canadian Radio-television and Telecommunications Commission (CRTC) imposed a mandatory analogue shutdown on August 31, 2011.

Transmitters

Former transmitters

Although CKWS' Smiths Falls repeater overlapped its signal with that of CBC owned-and-operated station CBOT/Ottawa while CKWS was a CBC affiliate, CKWS-TV-3 usually serves the Brockville area, along with the station's Prescott rebroadcaster. In 2018, Corus applied to the CRTC to shutdown several of its transmitters, including CKWS-TV-3.

As a result of a CRTC decision in December 2020, CKWS-DT-1 shuttered its transmitter in Brighton on August 31, 2022.  CKWS-DT-1 is now available via sub-channel on CHEX-DT out of Peterborough.  CKWS-DT-1 briefly broadcast on UHF 23 (PSIP 30) before ultimately being shuttered as it was required to vacate UHF 30 as a result of the DTV repack.

See also
CKWS-FM (formerly CKWS AM)
CFMK-FM (formerly CKWS-FM)

References

External links
Global Kingston

Fybush tower site descriptions – September 5, 2008 – Kingston, Ontario

Corus Entertainment
Mass media in Kingston, Ontario
Television channels and stations established in 1954
KWS-DT
KWS-DT
1954 establishments in Ontario